Richard Thornton (1776–1865) was an English millionaire.

Richard Thornton may also refer to:
Richard Lee (cricketer, born 1833) or Richard Napoleon Thornton (1833–1876)
Richard Thornton (cricketer) (1853–1928), English first-class cricketer
Richard Thornton (landowner) (1922–2014), Lord Lieutenant of Surrey, England
Richard Thornton, American physician, namesake of Dr. Richard Thornton House, a house in Halifax County, Virginia, United States

See also
Dick Thornton (disambiguation)
Richard Thornton Hewitt (1917–1994), British Army officer
Richard Thornton Wilson (1829–1910), American investment banker
Richard Thornton Wilson Jr. (1866–1929), American banker and businessman